Phani Gopal Sen Gupta (born 2nd February, 1905 in Purnea City, date of death 18 August, 1991) was an Indian politician who served as a member of 1st Lok Sabha from Purnia (Lok Sabha constituency) in Bihar State, India.

He was elected to 2nd, 3rd and 4th Lok Sabha   from Purnea, Bihar.

He was a leader and Freedom Fighter and was the Secretary of Purnea district Raadhi Kayastha Mahasabha.

References

1905 births
Year of death missing
India MPs 1952–1957
India MPs 1957–1962
India MPs 1962–1967
India MPs 1967–1970
Bihari politicians
Lok Sabha members from Bihar
People from Purnia